Kaloplocamus acutus is a species of sea slug, a nudibranch, a shell-less marine gastropod mollusk in the family Polyceridae.

Distribution 
This species was described from Japan where it is a moderately common animal. It has also been reported from Hong Kong, Eastern Australia and New Caledonia,.

References

External links 
 SeaSlug Forum info

Polyceridae
Gastropods described in 1949